Jeremiah Gridley or Jeremy Gridley (1702–1767) was a lawyer, editor, colonial legislator, and attorney general in Boston, Massachusetts, in the 18th century. He served as "Grand Master of the Masons in North America" around the 1760s, and was associated with the founding of the Boston Bar Association.

Biography
Born in 1702 in Boston to Richard Gridley (born 1684) and Rebecca Gridley, Jeremiah attended Harvard College (class of 1725); classmates included Mather Byles. Gridley married Abigail Lewis around 1730. In the 1730s he edited The Weekly Rehearsal, a literary magazine.

He practiced law in Boston. As a lawyer he trained John Adams, William Cushing, James Otis, Benjamin Pratt, and Oxenbridge Thacher. In 1761 "he defended the 'writs of assistance,' for which the custom house officers had applied to the superior court, and which authorized them to enter houses under suspicion of obtaining smuggled goods, at their own discretion. Gridley had for an antagonist in this case the celebrated patriot, James Otis."

"He was moderator of the town of Brookline 1759, 1760, and 1761, ... representative to the General Court for 1755, 1756, and 1757, and Attorney General in 1767." He also belonged to the Boston Marine Society.

Gridley died in 1767, and was buried in the Granary Burying Ground.

References

Further reading

Works by Gridley
 The Weekly Rehearsal. 1731–1735. (Edited/published by Gridley).
 American Magazine and Historical Chronicle. 1743–1746. (May have been edited by Gridley).

Works about Gridley
 Encyclopædia Americana: A popular dictionary of arts, sciences, literature, history, politics and biography, a new edition. 1845.
 R.G.F. Candage. Jeremy Gridley. Publications of the Brookline Historical Society. 1903.
 Lyon N. Richardson. A History of Early American Magazines, 1741–1789 (New York, 1931. Google books.
 John K. Reeves. Jeremy Gridley, Editor. New England Quarterly, Vol. 17, No. 2 (Jun., 1944), pp. 265–281.
 Albert Ten Eyck Gardner. A Majestick Shape: 1745. Metropolitan Museum of Art Bulletin, New Series, Vol. 8, No. 2 (Oct., 1949), pp. 74–80.

1702 births
1767 deaths
Harvard College alumni
Lawyers from Boston
Politicians from Brookline, Massachusetts
18th century in Boston
Massachusetts Attorneys General
Members of the colonial Massachusetts House of Representatives
Burials at Granary Burying Ground
People from colonial Boston
18th-century American politicians